The 2015–16 SEC women's basketball season began with practices in October 2015, followed by the start of the 2015–16 NCAA Division I women's basketball season in November. Conference play started in early January 2016 and concluded in March with the 2016 SEC women's basketball tournament at the Jacksonville Veterans Memorial Arena in Jacksonville, Florida.

Rankings

Rankings source:

Regular season

Conference matrix
This table summarizes the head-to-head results between teams in conference play.

References

 
Southeastern Conference women's basketball seasons